was a river gunboat of the Imperial Japanese Navy, part of the 11th Gunboat Sentai, that operated on the Yangtze River in China during the 1930s, and during the Second Sino-Japanese War. After World War II, the ship entered service with the Republic of China Navy as Yong Ping (永平), but was captured by the Chinese communists at the end of Chinese Civil War, and entered People's Liberation Army Navy as Wu Jiang (乌江). The ship was finally scrapped in the 1960s.

Sources 
 Japanese gunboats (with photos) 
 Vessels of the IJN
  Monograph 144 Chapter II

Atami-class gunboats
Second Sino-Japanese War naval ships of Japan
Ships built by Mitsui Engineering and Shipbuilding
Ships of the Republic of China Navy
Ships of the People's Liberation Army Navy